George Isaac Harvey (November 29, 1892 – December 13, 1973) was a politician in the Canadian province of Ontario, who served in the Legislative Assembly of Ontario from 1943 to 1951. He represented the electoral district of Sault Ste. Marie as a member of the Co-operative Commonwealth Federation (CCF).

References

 

1892 births
1973 deaths
People from Chatham, Kent
People from Sault Ste. Marie, Ontario
Ontario Co-operative Commonwealth Federation MPPs
English emigrants to Canada
20th-century Canadian politicians